The 2022 Australian Short Course Swimming Championships were held from 24 to 27 August 2022 at the Sydney Olympic Park Aquatic Centre in Sydney, New South Wales.

Racing was spread over four days of competition featuring heats in the morning and finals in the evening session. The event doubled up as the national trials for the 2022 FINA World Swimming Championships to be held in Melbourne, Victoria.

Schedule

M = Morning session, E = Evening session

Medal winners
The medallist for the open events are below.

Men's events

Men's multi-class events

Women's events

Women's multi-class events

Mixed events

Legend:

Club points scores
The final club point scores are below. Only the top ten clubs are listed.

References

Swimming Championships
Australian championships
Australian Swimming Championships
Sports competitions in Sydney
Australian Swimming Championships